Kommersant Dengi was a weekly print business and finance magazine published in Moscow, Russia. In January 2017 the magazine became online-only publication.

History and profile
Kommersant Dengi was established in 1994. It was published by Kommersant Publishing House on a weekly basis. The company was owned by Boris Berezovsky from 1999 to 2006 and then was acquired by Badri Patarkatsishvili. The same year Alisher Usmanov bought the company. The magazine was headquartered in Moscow. Its sister publications included Kommersant Vlast, which was formerly named Kommersant-Weekly, and daily newspaper Kommersant. Sergei Yakovlev is among the former editors-in-chief of the magazine.

Kommersant Dengi covers articles on the analysis of financial markets, investments and practical information about financial companies. In 2002 the magazine sold 85,000 copies. In January 2017 it was announced that the print version of the magazine closed and that it would continue as an online magazine.

References

External links
 

1994 establishments in Russia
2017 disestablishments in Russia
Business magazines published in Russia
Defunct magazines published in Russia
Magazines established in 1994
Magazines disestablished in 2017
Magazines published in Moscow
Online magazines with defunct print editions
Russian-language magazines
Weekly magazines published in Russia